Mia Sasha McKenna-Bruce (born 3 July 1997) is an English actress. She gained prominence through her role as Tee Taylor in Tracy Beaker Returns (2010–2012) and The Dumping Ground (2013–2018). She has since appeared in the iPlayer series Get Even (2020) as Bree Deringer and the Netflix film Persuasion (2022).

Early life
McKenna-Bruce was born on 3 July 1997 in London and was raised in Chislehurst, Bromley. McKenna-Bruce took dance classes at Liz Burville Performing Arts Centre in Bexley and was a student at Belcanto London Academy. McKenna-Bruce also attended the Sapphire Dance Academy in Bexleyheath, as well as the Maidstone Grammar School for Girls. McKenna-Bruce has two sisters, Anya and Ellis.

Career
McKenna-Bruce's first role was a ballet girl in the West End production of Billy Elliot. Her first TV role was the minor role of Ester in the TV short, Small Dark Places. She then starred in Holby City as Abi Taylor for one episode. McKenna-Bruce then appeared in EastEnders as Penny Branning. She had a two episode guest in January 2008 and then another three episode guest stint in April 2008. McKenna-Bruce next starred in The Bill in 2009 as Keira Curtis for one episode. She then moved on to Doctors for three episodes.

Later in 2009, McKenna-Bruce starred in her first film role, The Fourth Kind, playing Ashley Tyler. Her next role was as main character Tee Taylor in Tracy Beaker Returns from 2010 to 2012. In 2011, McKenna-Bruce appeared in the TV series Spy for 1 episode and in 5 episodes of The Tracy Beaker Survival Guide. McKenna-Bruce reprised the role of Tee Taylor from 2013 until 2016 (and again as a guest in 2017 and 2018) in the spin-off series The Dumping Ground. McKenna-Bruce played Tee Taylor in a The Dumping Ground spin-off, The Dumping Ground: I'm..., a webisode series. She guest starred in another episode of Holby City as Asia Lucas, as well as guest starring in BBC Three's Josh. McKenna-Bruce was cast as the lead in a feature film, The Rebels. In 2020, she began portraying the role of Bree Deringer on the iPlayer teen thriller series Get Even. In 2021, she appeared in an episode of Vera, later being cast in the Netflix film Persuasion. In August of that same year, the actress was cast as Mia Karp in the PeacockTV fantasy series Vampire Academy, based on the best-selling book series by Richelle Mead.

Personal life
In February 2022, McKenna-Bruce became engaged to actor Tom Leach.

Filmography

Film

Television

Video games

References

External links
 

1997 births
21st-century English actresses
Actresses from London
English child actresses
English film actresses
English soap opera actresses
English television actresses
Living people
People educated at Maidstone Grammar School for Girls